Browns Run is a small tributary to South Fork Tenmile Creek in southwestern Pennsylvania.  The stream rises in northeastern Greene County and flows south-southeast entering South Fork Tenmile Creek at Mather, Pennsylvania. The watershed is roughly 31% agricultural, 61% forested and the rest is other uses.

References

Rivers of Pennsylvania
Tributaries of the Monongahela River
Rivers of Greene County, Pennsylvania